Flavimaricola is a genus of bacteria from the family of Rhodobacteraceae with one known species, Flavimaricola marinus.

References

Rhodobacteraceae
Bacteria genera
Monotypic bacteria genera